Strenči Municipality is a former municipality in Vidzeme, Latvia. The municipality was formed in 2009 by merging Jērcēni parish, Plāņi parish, Strenči town and Seda town with its countryside territory; the administrative centre being Strenči. The population in 2020 was 2,838.

On 1 July 2021, Strenči Municipality ceased to exist and its territory was merged into Valmiera Municipality.

Population

Twin towns — sister cities

Strenči is twinned with:
 Lainate, Italy
 Rimóc, Hungary
 Rosice, Czech Republic
 Sayda, Germany

See also
Administrative divisions of Latvia

References

 
Former municipalities of Latvia